Arthur Hunt may refer to:

 Arthur Surridge Hunt (1871–1934), English papyrologist
 Arthur Hunt (water polo) (1886–1949), British water polo player
 Arthur G. Hunt, American plant and soils scientist
 Arthur Leigh Hunt, New Zealand businessman and founder in 1953 of New Zealand Antarctic Society